Frank Michael or  Frank-Michael may refer to:

Frank Michael
Frank Michael, Belgian singer of Italian origin 
Frank Michael Beyer (1928–2008), German composer

Frank-Michael
Frank-Michael Wahl (born 1956), German handball player
Frank-Michael Marczewski (born 1954), German football (soccer) player

See also
Michael Franks